Daniel Gerald "Gerry" Nutter (7 June 1928 – 13 September 2016) was an Australian public servant and diplomat.

Career
Nutter was educated at North Sydney Boys High School.

Nutter joined the Department of External Affairs in 1949. His early postings were to Saigon, Katmandu, Delhi, Tokyo, Vientiane, Bonn and Berlin.

From 1973 to 1975, Nutter was head of national assessments in the Department of Defence, a precursor to the modern-day stand-alone Office of National Assessments. In the role he was responsible for long-term intelligence functions. His first ambassadorial post was Australian Ambassador to the Philippines, from 1975 to 1978. Nutter's next appointment was Australian High Commissioner to Papua New Guinea was announced in September 1977. While resident in Port Moresby, Nutter made extensive tours to inspect Australian tax-funded development projects across the nation.

In 1985, Nutter was appointed Australian Ambassador to Italy.

Nutter died on 13 September 2016.

References

|-

|-

1928 births
Ambassadors of Australia to Italy
Ambassadors of Australia to Libya
Ambassadors of Australia to the Philippines
High Commissioners of Australia to Papua New Guinea
Living people
People educated at North Sydney Boys High School